Ministry of Entrepreneurship and Technology is a Polish government administration office.

The Ministry was established on 12 January 2018 (with effect from 9 January 2018) after separating from the existing Ministry of Development.

Ministers

External links
 Official government website of Poland

References

2018
2018
Poland,2018
2018 establishments in Poland